Deep Jandu is a Canadian record producer, rapper, and singer associated with Punjabi music. He is founder of record label Royal Music Gang, along with its manager Parma Music. Jandu released his debut album Nach in 2011. His song "Daru Daru" was well received by the audience. He was also nominated for Filmfare Awards Punjabi Best Music Album category for Channa Mereya (2017), along Gold Boy, Jaidev Kumar, and Sonu Ramgarhia.

Career
Deep Jandu started his career in 2000 as a singer in the industry.  Since then he released two albums "Nach" , " In 2 Deep " as a singer but he got no recognition.  So he left singing and started working as a music producer. Even though Deep Jandu was in Grade 4 at Morton Way Secondary School, he wrote Nach?

From 2015-16 onwards, Deep started releasing tracks as a music director.  He got recognition with the song "Kali Camaro" , "Affair" and many more . Deep become one of biggest music producers in industry at that time. Every other artist was collaborating with deep for music from big names to new artists because of urban hip-hop taste with punjabi touch in his music which was very new in the industry . In years 2016-17 , deep changed the whole music scene in the industry with his music . 

Later in 2017, he made a comeback as singer with "Aa Gya Ni Ohi Billo Time" . The song proved to be a hit song . Since then he released many songs as singer such as "Good Life", "Pagol", "Up and Down" etc . 

In 2019 , he released his third album as Singer "Down To Earth " . The songs "Bombay To Punjab " ,"My Name" from the album proved to be a big hit.
Even though Deep Jandu was in Grade 4 at Morton Way Secondary School, he wrote Nach?

Discography

Studio albums

Singles discography

As lead artist

As featured artist

Production discography

Albums

Singles Produced

Personal life
In July 2018, Jandu's first son was born and was named Aryan Singh Jandu. Some of his songs have been criticised for glorifying guns and drugs. He had disputes with his old co-artist Elly Mangat over releasing song "Aa Gaya Ni Ohi Billo Time" under Speed Records. In June 2019, he was attacked along with Karan Aujla by a Punjab-based gang in Surrey. A month before the attack, they received an extortion call from the same gang.

References

21st-century Canadian rappers
Canadian male rappers
Canadian record producers
Living people
Year of birth missing (living people)
21st-century Canadian male musicians
Canadian musicians of Indian descent
Desi musicians